The 1928–29 season was Leicester City's 31st season in the Football League and their 5th in the First Division. Led by their formidable strike force of Ernie Hine, Arthur Chandler and Arthur Lochhead (all three of whom are still placed today among Leicester's top five goalscorers of all-time) and inspirational captain and creative lynch-pin Johnny Duncan, Leicester finished runners-up in the First Division, just one point behind winners The Wednesday. It was the club's highest ever league finish until the 2015–16 Season where the team won their first ever top division championship.

The most remarkable game of the season came on 20 October 1928 in which Leicester thrashed Portsmouth 10-0, which still stands as Leicester's record league victory. The club's all-time record goalscorer Arthur Chandler netted an incredible six goals in the game. A legend surrounding the game says that just after Chandler scored his 5th goal of the afternoon, 5 swans flew over Filbert Street. Several minutes later a further sixth swan flew overhead, to which Chandler promptly responded by scoring his sixth goal of the afternoon.

Overview
The close season saw Leicester hold on to the spine of the team that had helped them to third place in the First Division the previous season. A bid for star man and club captain Johnny Duncan from Everton firmly rejected, while a deal for George Ritchie, who signed from Falkirk remained the major transfer dealing of the summer.

An indifferent start to the season saw Leicester sit 14th after 8 games and the season got worse after both Duncan and Reg Osborne picked up injuries which would see them kept out for lengthy periods of the season soon after.

However, fortunes began to turn on the pitch as Leicester picked up four wins on the bounce, including the legendary 10-0 win against Portsmouth. Leicester, who were being captained for the first time by centre half George Carr, were 5-0 up at half-time, in a first-half which included a 14-minute Arthur Chandler hat-trick. After 70 minutes when Chandler netted his 5th goal, five swans flew over Filbert Street, which led to cheers from the home crowd. A few minutes later, after Ernie Hine had made it 8-0, a sixth swan flew overhead, which caused the crowd to react and call for Chandler to score his sixth, to which Chandler responded by promptly scoring, to equal teammate's Johnny Duncan's record of scoring 6 goals in a single match. Hine rounded up a hat-trick of his own shortly afterwards to make it 10-0 and to round off Leicester's record ever league win.

Inspired by this win Leicester rapidly began to climb the table and by 6 April, Leicester sat in second place 4 points off the lead with a game in hand However, it was ironically defeat against Portsmouth in their game in hand which may have cost Leicester the title as Leicester took 6 points from their final 5 games, they ended up the season as division runners-up, knowing that just one more point would have been enough to clinch the title from The Wednesday, having finished the season with a superior goal average.

Results

Football League First Division

Leicester City scores given first

FA Cup
Leicester City scores given first

Club statistics
All data from: Dave Smith and Paul Taylor, Of Fossils and Foxes: The Official Definitive History of Leicester City Football Club (2001)

Appearances

Starting XI
The following players have been named in the most starting line-ups. This line-up may differ from the list of players with most appearances.

Top goalscorers

References

Leicester City F.C. seasons
Leicester City